"Electric Relaxation" is the second single from A Tribe Called Quest's third album Midnight Marauders. It contains a sample of the song "Mystic Brew" by jazz organist Ronnie Foster.

The track was featured as the opening theme song for The WB's black sitcom The Wayans Bros., for the first two seasons.

Production
In a conversation with XXL, Phife Dawg revealed that the beat for "Electric Relaxation" was created in his grandmother's basement by Q-Tip:

Charts

Certifications

References

1994 singles
1993 songs
A Tribe Called Quest songs
Songs written by Q-Tip (musician)
Jive Records singles
Song recordings produced by Q-Tip (musician)
Songs written by Ali Shaheed Muhammad
Songs written by Phife Dawg
Black-and-white music videos
Jazz rap songs